Jackson Smith Batey Jr. (1900 – August 8, 1983) was an American football player and coach. He served as the head football coach at East Tennessee State University from 1930 to 1931.

Batey was a collegiate athlete at the University of Tennessee, lettering in football and basketball.

Head coaching record

References

External links
 

1900 births
1983 deaths
American football ends
East Tennessee State Buccaneers football coaches
Tennessee Volunteers basketball players
Tennessee Volunteers football players